This is a list of notable municipal officials who have endorsed Joe Biden's campaign for President of the United States in the 2020 U.S. presidential election.

Mayors

Current 

José Román Abreu, Mayor of San Lorenzo, Puerto Rico (2001–present)
Steve Adler, Mayor of Austin, Texas (2016–present)
Carlos Delgado Altieri, President of the Popular Democratic Party of Puerto Rico (2020–present), Mayor of Isabela, Puerto Rico (2001–2021), candidate for governor in 2020 (Popular Democratic)
Tom Barrett, Mayor of Milwaukee Wisconsin (2004–present)
Stephen K. Benjamin, Mayor of Columbia, South Carolina (2010–present)
Andy Berke, Mayor of Chattanooga, Tennessee (2013–2021)
Ravinder Bhalla, Mayor of Hoboken, New Jersey (2018–present)
Percy Bland, Mayor of Meridian, Mississippi (2013–2021)
Rosalynn Bliss, Mayor of Grand Rapids, Michigan (2016–present)
Keisha Lance Bottoms, Mayor of Atlanta, Georgia (2018–present)
London Breed, Mayor of San Francisco, California (2017–present) (previously endorsed Kamala Harris, then Michael Bloomberg)
Luke Bronin, Mayor of Hartford, Connecticut (2016–present)
Aja Brown, Mayor of Compton, California (2013–2021)
Christopher Cabaldon, Mayor of West Sacramento, California (1998–2020)
LaToya Cantrell, Mayor of New Orleans, Louisiana (2018–present)
Melvin Carter, Mayor of Saint Paul, Minnesota (2018–present)
Jane Castor, Mayor of Tampa, Florida (2019–present)
Steve Chirico, Mayor of Naperville, Illinois (2015–present) (Republican)
Mitch Colvin, Mayor of Fayetteville, NC (2017–present)
John Cranley, Mayor of Cincinnati, Ohio (2013–present)
John E. Dailey, Mayor of Tallahassee, Florida (2018–present)
Hardie Davis, Mayor of Augusta, Georgia (2015–present)
Bill de Blasio, Mayor of New York City, New York (2014–present), 2020 candidate for president
Jerry Demings, Mayor of Orange County, Florida (2018–present)
Mike Duggan, Mayor of Detroit, Michigan (2014–present)
Jenny Durkan, Mayor of Seattle, Washington (2017–present), U.S. Attorney for the Western District of Washington (2009–2014)
Buddy Dyer, Mayor of Orlando, Florida (2003–present)
Greg Fischer, Mayor of Louisville, Kentucky (2011–present)
Jacob Frey, Mayor of Minneapolis, Minnesota (2018–present)
Steven Fulop, Mayor of Jersey City, New Jersey (2013–present)
Kate Gallego, Mayor of Phoenix, AZ (2019–present)
Eric Garcetti, Mayor of Los Angeles, California (2013–present)
Robert Garcia, Mayor of Long Beach, California (2014–present)
Dan Gelber, Mayor of Miami Beach, Florida (2017–present), Minority Leader of the Florida House of Representatives (2006–2008)
Andrew Ginther, Mayor of Columbus, Ohio (2016–present)
Michael Hancock, Mayor of Denver, Colorado (2011–present)
Lee Harris, Mayor of Shelby County, Tennessee (2018–present), Tennessee State Senator from District 17 (2015–2018) and Tennessee Senate Minority Leader (2015–2018)
Dan Horrigan, Mayor of Akron, Ohio (2016–present)
Christine Hunschofsky, Mayor of Parkland, Florida (2017–2020)
Sadaf Jaffer, Mayor of Montgomery Township, New Jersey (2019–present)
Teri Johnston, Mayor of Key West, Florida (2018–present)
Wade Kapszukiewicz, Mayor of Toledo, Ohio, (2018–present)
Jim Kenney, Mayor of Philadelphia, Pennsylvania (2016–present)
Lyda Krewson, Mayor of St. Louis, Missouri (2017–2021)
Rick Kriseman, Mayor of St. Petersburg, Florida (2014–present)
Emily Larson, Mayor of Duluth, Minnesota (2016–present)
Lydia Lavelle, Mayor of Carrboro, North Carolina (2013–present)
Sam Liccardo, Mayor of San Jose, California (2014–present)
Lori Lightfoot, Mayor of Chicago, Illinois (2019–present)
Vi Lyles, Mayor of Charlotte, North Carolina (2017–present)
David R. Mayer, Mayor of Gloucester Township, New Jersey (2010–present)
María Meléndez, Mayor of Ponce, Puerto Rico (2009–2021)
Darrio Melton, Mayor of Selma, Alabama (2016–present)
Erin Mendenhall, Mayor of Salt Lake City, Utah (2020–present)
Ken Miyagishima, Mayor of Las Cruces, New Mexico (2007–present)
Frank Moran, Mayor of Camden, New Jersey (2018–present)
Svante Myrick, Mayor of Ithaca, New York (2012–present)
Sheldon Neeley, Mayor of Flint, Michigan (2019–present), Michigan State Representative (2015–2019)
Bill Peduto, Mayor of Pittsburgh, Pennsylvania (2014–present)
Andre Quintero, Mayor of El Monte, California (2009–2020)
Satya Rhodes-Conway, Mayor of Madison, Wisconsin (2019–present)
Hazelle P. Rogers, Mayor of Lauderdale Lakes, Florida (2018–present)
Regina Romero, Mayor of Tucson, Arizona (2019–present)
Mary Salas, Mayor of Chula Vista, California (2014–present)
Libby Schaaf, Mayor of Oakland, California (2015–present)
Andy Schor, Mayor of Lansing, Michigan (2018–present)
Frank Scott Jr., Mayor of Little Rock, Arkansas (2019–present)
Kathy Sheehan, Mayor of Albany, New York (2014–present)
Marty Small Sr., Mayor of Atlantic City, New Jersey (2019–present)
Darrell Steinberg, Mayor of Sacramento, California (2016–present)
Levar Stoney, Mayor of Richmond, Virginia (2017–present), Secretary of the Commonwealth of Virginia (2014–2016)
Jim Strickland, Mayor of Memphis, Tennessee (2016–present)
Sean Strub, Mayor of Milford, Pennsylvania (2017–present)
John Tecklenburg, Mayor of Charleston, South Carolina (2016–present)
Michael Tubbs, Mayor of Stockton, California (2017–2021)
Sylvester Turner, Mayor of Houston, Texas (2016–present)
Ben Walsh, Mayor of Syracuse, New York (2018–present) (Reform/Independence)
Stephen T. Williams, Mayor of Huntington, West Virginia (2013–present)
Marty Walsh, Mayor of Boston, Massachusetts (2014–2021), Massachusetts State Representative (1997–2014)
Nan Whaley, Mayor of Dayton, Ohio (2014–present)
Jenny Wilson, Mayor of Salt Lake County, Utah (2019–present)
Victoria Woodards, Mayor of Tacoma, Washington (2018–present)
Randall Woodfin, Mayor of Birmingham, Alabama (2017–present)
Nelson Torres Yordán, Mayor of Guayanilla, Puerto Rico (2016–2021)
Jack Young, Mayor of Baltimore, Maryland (2019–present)

Former 

Robert A. Baines, Mayor of Manchester, New Hampshire (2000–2006)
Ralph Becker, Mayor of Salt Lake City, Utah (2008–2016)
Michael Bloomberg, Mayor of New York City, New York (2002–2013), 2020 candidate for president (Formerly Republican and Independent, Democratic since 2018)
Bob Buckhorn, Mayor of Tampa, Florida (2011–2019)
Tim Burgess, Mayor of Seattle, Washington (2017)
Pete Buttigieg, Mayor of South Bend, Indiana (2012–2020), 2020 candidate for president
Michael B. Coleman, Mayor of Columbus, Ohio (2000–2016)
John Cook, Mayor of El Paso, Texas (2005–2013)
Peter Corroon, Mayor of Salt Lake City, Utah (2004–2013)
Karl Dean, Mayor of Nashville, Tennessee (2007–2015)
Pat Evans, Mayor of Plano, Texas (2002–2009)
Sandra Freedman, Mayor of Tampa, Florida (1986–1995)
Andrew Gillum, Mayor of Tallahassee (2014-2018)
Bill Gluba, Mayor of Davenport, Iowa (2008–2016)
Wilson Goode, Mayor of Philadelphia, Pennsylvania (1984–1992)
Phil Gordon, Mayor of Phoenix, Arizona (2004–2012)
Mike Guingona, Mayor of Daly City, California (1993–2018)
Phil Hardberger, Mayor of San Antonio, Texas (2005–2009)
Pat Hays, Mayor of North Little Rock, Arkansas (1989–2013)
Sly James, Mayor of Kansas City, Missouri (2011–2019)
Jan Laverty Jones, Mayor of Las Vegas, Nevada (1991–1999)
Sukhee Kang, Mayor of Irvine, California (2008–2012)
Mark Mallory, Mayor of Cincinnati, Ohio (2005–2013)
Michael Nutter, Mayor of Philadelphia, Pennsylvania (2008–2016)
Douglas Palmer, Mayor of Trenton, New Jersey (1990–2010)
Annise Parker, Mayor of Houston, Texas (2010–2016)
Mike Rawlings, Mayor of Dallas, Texas (2011–2019), CEO of Pizza Hut (1997–2002)
Stephanie Rawlings-Blake, Mayor of Baltimore, Maryland (2010–2016)
Norm Rice, Mayor of Seattle, Washington (1990–1998)
Joseph P. Riley Jr., Mayor of Charleston, South Carolina (1975–2016)
Michael Signer, Mayor of Charlottesville, Virginia (2016–2018)
Francis Slay, Mayor of St. Louis (2001–2017)
Mark Stodola, Mayor of Little Rock, Arkansas (2007–2018)
Kathy Taylor, Mayor of Tulsa, Oklahoma (2006–2009)
Karen Weaver, Mayor of Flint, Michigan (2015–2019)
Wellington Webb, Mayor of Denver, Colorado (1991–2003)

Other municipal officials

Current 
 
Art Acevedo, Chief of Police of the Houston Police Department (2016–present)
Angela Alsobrooks, County Executive of Prince George's County, MD (2018–present)
Steve Bellone, County Executive of Suffolk County, NY (2012–present)
Melissa Conyears, City Treasurer of Chicago (2019–present)
Rich Fitzgerald, Chief Executive of Allegheny County (2012–present)
Kim Foxx, Cook County State's Attorney (2016–present)
Lina Hidalgo, County Judge of Harris County, TX (2019–present)
Larry Krasner, District Attorney of Philadelphia (2018–present)
Mike Reese, Sheriff of Multnomah County, Oregon (2016–present)

Former 
Phil Heimlich, Cincinnati City Councilor (1993–2001) (Republican)
Suzy Loftus, San Francisco District Attorney (2019–2020)
Rick Romley, County Attorney for Maricopa County, AZ (2010, 1989–2005) (Republican)

Local legislators

Current 

Frank Baker, Boston City Councilor (2011–present)
Cindy Bass, Philadelphia City Councilor (2012–present)
Kendra Brooks, Philadelphia City Councilor (2019–present) (Working Families Party)
Darrell L. Clarke, President of the Philadelphia City Council (2012–present), Philadelphia City Councilor (1999–present)
John Collins-Muhammad, St. Louis Alderman from Ward 21 (2017–present)
Derek S. Green, Philadelphia City Councilor (2014–present)
Helen Gym, Philadelphia City Councilor (2016–present)
Debora Juarez, Seattle City Councilor from District 5 (2016–present)
Mark Kersey, San Diego City Councilor (2012–present) (Independent)
Ann Kobayashi, Honolulu City Councilor from District 5 (2009–present, 2002–2008), Hawaii State Senator from District 10 (1981–1994)
Stephe Koontz, Doraville City Counselor (2018–present)
Paul Koretz, Los Angeles City Councilor (2009–present)
Joey Manahan, Honolulu City Councilor from District 7 (2013–present), Hawaii State representative from District 29 (2007–2013)
Kevin McManus, Member of the Kansas City, Missouri City Council from District 6 (2015–present)
Jonathan Melton, Raleigh City Councilman (2019–present)
Vop Osili, president of the Indianapolis City-County Council (2018–present), Indianapolis City-County Council from District 11 (2012–present)
Cherelle Parker, Philadelphia City Councilor (2016–present)
Kymberly Pine, Honolulu City Councilor from District 1 (2013–2021), Hawaii State Representative from District 43 (2004–2012) 
Lewis E. Reed, President of the St. Louis Board of Aldermen (2017–present)
Brandon Scott, President of the Baltimore City Councilor (2019–present), Member of the Baltimore City Council from District 2 (2011–2019)
P.G. Sittenfeld, Cincinnati City Councilor (2011–present)
Mark Squilla, Philadelphia City Councilor (2014–present)
Marian B. Tasco, Philadelphia City Councilor (1998–2016)
Ritchie Torres, New York City City Councilor (2014–2021) and 2020 nominee for New York's 15th congressional district

Former 
Martha Choe, Seattle City Councilor (1991–1998)
Alex Wan, Atlanta City Counselor (2010–2018)

Judicial officials

Current 
Lina Hidalgo, County Judge of Harris County, Texas (2019–present)
Nelson Wolff, County Judge of Bexar County, Texas (2001–present), Mayor of San Antonio, Texas (1991–1995)

Former 
Kevin A. Ross, Judge on the Los Angeles County Superior Court (1999–2005) (Republican)

See also
Endorsements in the 2020 Democratic Party presidential primaries
News media endorsements in the 2020 United States presidential primaries
News media endorsements in the 2020 United States presidential election
List of Donald Trump 2020 presidential campaign political endorsements
List of Donald Trump 2020 presidential campaign non-political endorsements
List of former Trump administration officials who endorsed Joe Biden
List of Jo Jorgensen 2020 presidential campaign endorsements
List of Howie Hawkins 2020 presidential campaign endorsements
List of Republicans who opposed the Donald Trump 2020 presidential campaign

Notes

References

External links